Odo or ODO may refer to:

People
 Odo, a given name; includes a list of people and fictional characters with the name
 Franklin Odo (1939–2022), Japanese-American historian
 Seikichi Odo (1927–2002), Japanese karateka
 Yuya Odo (born 1990), Japanese rugby union player

Sport
 Ōdō Tournament, a Japanese professional wrestling competition
 ODO Riga, a defunct sports club in Riga, Latvian SSR
 FC CSKA Kyiv, formerly ODO Kyiv, a Ukrainian football club
 SC Odesa, formerly ODO Odesa, a Ukrainian football club
 SKA Lviv, formerly ODO Lviv, a Ukrainian football club

Other uses
 Odo (spider), a genus of spiders
 Odo Dam, a dam in Kōchi Prefecture, Japan
 Bodaybo Airport (IATA code), Irkutsk Oblast, Russia
 Oxford Dictionaries Online, now Lexico, a dictionary website
 ODO, a 2008 EP by the Funeral Orchestra
 "Odo", a 2021 song by Ado
 Odometer